John Stephen Cummins (born March 3, 1928) is an American prelate of the Roman Catholic Church. He served as bishop of the Diocese of Oakland in California from 1977 to 2003 and as an auxiliary bishop of the Diocese of Sacramento in California from 1974 to 1977.

Biography

Early life and education 
John Cummins was born on March 3, 1928, in Berkeley, California to Michael and Mary (née Connolly) Cummins, Irish immigrants. His brother Bernard Cummins was a priest who served as superintendent of schools in the Archdiocese of San Francisco.

John Cummins received his primary education at St. Augustine Parish School in Oakland. In 1941, he began his studies for the priesthood at St. Joseph's College Seminary in Mountain View, California,  where he earned a Bachelor of Arts degree in 1947 In 1947, he entered St. Patrick's Seminary in Menlo Park, California, earning a Master of Divinity degree in 1953.  Cummins later worked on graduate studies in history at the University of California, Berkeley.

Priesthood 
On January 24, 1953, Cummins was ordained a priest by Bishop Hugh Donohoe at the Cathedral of St. Mary of the Assumption in San Francisco.

Cummins' first assignment was as a curate at Mission Dolores Basilica in San Francisco, where he remained for four years. He also served as chaplain at the Newman Centre of San Francisco State University and at Mills College. In 1957, Cummins started teaching at Bishop O'Dowd High School in Oakland, staying there  until 1962, when he became chancellor of the Diocese of Oakland. He was named a domestic prelate by the Vatican in 1963.

In addition to his duties as chancellor, Cummins coordinated the Social Justice and Ecumenical Commissions, and oversaw the diocesan insurance program. He also served as the diocesan liaison to the Dominican School of Philosophy and Theology in Berkeley, the Franciscan School of Theology in Oceanside, California., and the Jesuit School of Theology of Santa Clara University.

Cummins continued to serve as chancellor until 1971, when he was named executive director of the California Catholic Conference. In that capacity, he channeled the functions of the conference by providing liaison with state departments and with the California State Legislature, disseminating information to Catholic associations and organizations and to other state conferences and the United States Catholic Conference (USCCB) and coordinating interdiocesan activities in the areas of education and welfare.

Auxiliary Bishop of Sacramento 
On February 26, 1974, Pope Paul VI appointed Cummins as an auxiliary bishop of the Diocese of Sacramento and titular bishop of Lambaesis. He received his episcopal consecration on May 16, 1974, from Bishop Alden Bell, with Bishops Floyd Begin and Hugh Donohoe serving as co-consecrators, at the Memorial Auditorium in Sacramento As an auxiliary bishop, Cummins continued to serve as executive director of the California Catholic Conference, a position which he held until 1977.

Bishop of Oakland 
Following the death of Bishop Floyd Begin, Pope Paul VI appointed Cummins as the second bishop of the Diocese of Oakland on May 3, 1977. His installation took place on June 30, 1977.

In February 1982, Cummins wrote to Cardinal Joseph Ratzinger, then head of the Congregation for the Doctrine of the Faith, forwarding a request from Stephen Kiesle, a priest in the diocese, to be laicized.  Kiesle had been convicted of misdemeanor lewd conduct with a child in 1978 and had been suspended by the diocese from ministry.  After a request from the Vatican in 1982 for more documentation, Cummins heard nothing from Ratzinger until 1985, when Cummins was told the matter would take more time.  Kiesle was finally defrocked in 1987.

Cummins served as chairman of the USCCB Liturgy Committee (1981–84), the Laity Committee (1988–91), and the Migration and Refugee Services Committee (1995–98). From 1992 to 1995, he was co-chair of the Roman Catholic-Reformed-Presbyterian Dialogue Commission and a consultant of the Ecumenical and Religious Committee. Cummins was president of the California Catholic Conference from 1988 to 1997. He was chairman of the Catholic Legal Immigration Network, Inc. (CLINIC) from 1995 to 1999, and served as a delegate to several synods in Rome.

Retirement 
After reaching the mandatory retirement age of 75 for bishops, Cummins resigned as Bishop of Oakland on October 1, 2003.  That same day, Saint Mary's College of California in Moraga, California, announced that Cummins would be working in the newly established John S. Cummins Catholic Institute for Thought, Culture and Action.

On April 4, 2004, Cummins testified for the plaintiffs in a sexual abuse lawsuit against the Diocese of Oakland.  The plaintiffs were two brothers, Bob and Tom Thatcher, who charged that Robert Ponciroli, a priest at St. Ignatius Parish in Antioch, California, molested them when they were minors in the early 1980s.  Cummins said that he learned about allegations against Ponciroli in 1995, but did not notify police or try to find the victims.  Cummins apologized for his failure to search for the victims. In 2016, Cummins published the book Vatican II, Berkeley and Beyond, a collection of reflections on the Vatican II Council and its effects on the church.

See also
 

 Catholic Church hierarchy
 Catholic Church in the United States
 Historical list of the Catholic bishops of the United States
 List of Catholic bishops of the United States
 Lists of patriarchs, archbishops, and bishops

References

External links
Roman Catholic Diocese of Oakland Official Site

Episcopal succession

1928 births
Living people
People from Oakland, California
20th-century Roman Catholic bishops in the United States
Roman Catholic Diocese of Oakland
Roman Catholic Diocese of Sacramento
People from Berkeley, California
Saint Patrick's Seminary and University alumni
Catholics from California
21st-century Roman Catholic bishops in the United States